Chandrakanta Abhidhan is an Assamese Language to English dictionary, the third one published. It contains 36,816 words and was originally compiled and published by Asam Sahitya Sabha in 1933.

In 1987, the Gauhati University published a third edition of this dictionary, edited by Maheswar Neog and Upendranath Goswami. Chandrakanta Abhidhan is available online since 2009.

References

External links 

 
 

Assamese language
Books from Assam
Assamese-language books